The Chuvash Autonomous Soviet Socialist Republic was an autonomous republic of the Russian SFSR within the Soviet Union.

The successor of the Chuvash Autonomous Oblast, the Chuvash ASSR was formed in 1925. It declared its sovereignty within the Soviet Union in 1990 as the Chuvash Republic (still within Russia). 

Its primary economic activities were agricultural. Grain and fruit production and logging are emphasized. The capital city was Cheboksary.

Notable people 
 

Eduard Mochalov (born 1974), journalist and former businessman

See also 
 Chuvash Autonomous Oblast
 Chuvashia
 First Secretary of the Chuvash Communist Party
 Society for the study of the native land (Chuvashia)
 Flag of the Chuvash Autonomous Soviet Socialist Republic

References 

Autonomous republics of the Russian Soviet Federative Socialist Republic
States and territories established in 1925
Former socialist republics
1925 establishments in the Soviet Union
1992 disestablishments in Russia
History of Chuvashia